Cape Gazelle is a cape in East New Britain province, Papua New Guinea located in the far north-east of the Gazelle Peninsula. The cape was named by Georg Gustav Freiherr von Schleinitz after his ship .

East New Britain Province